Ge Huijun (born March 1963) is a Chinese politician who served as chairwoman of the Zhejiang Provincial Committee of the Chinese People's Political Consultative Conference. She is a member of the 13th National Committee of the Chinese People's Political Consultative Conference. She was an alternate member of the 18th Central Committee of the Chinese Communist Party and is an alternate member of the 19th Central Committee of the Chinese Communist Party.

Biography
She graduated from Shaoxing Normal School (now Shaoxing University). From August 1983 to September 2003, she worked in the Communist Youth League. After a short period of working in Ningbo, she was named acting mayor of Jinhua in March 2005 and was installed as mayor in the following month. She was appointed vice governor of Zhejiang in July 2007 and was admitted to member of the standing committee of the CCP Zhejiang Provincial Committee, the province's top authority. In July 2012, she was appointed head of Propaganda Department of Zhejiang Provincial Committee of the Chinese Communist Party, succeeding . In January 2018, she became chairwoman of the Zhejiang Provincial Committee of the Chinese People's Political Consultative Conference, the province's top political advisory body.

References

1963 births
Living people
People from Zhuji
Central Party School of the Chinese Communist Party alumni
People's Republic of China politicians from Zhejiang
Chinese Communist Party politicians from Zhejiang
Members of the 13th Chinese People's Political Consultative Conference
Alternate members of the 18th Central Committee of the Chinese Communist Party
Alternate members of the 19th Central Committee of the Chinese Communist Party